The Erdmannshöhle is a stalactite or flowstone cave in the village Hasel between Schopfheim and Wehr, 20 km east of Lörrach in Baden-Württemberg in Germany.

Name 
The word Erdmannshöhle is comparable to earth man's hole and composed of the three German nouns Erde (earth), Mann (man) and Höhle (cave). Erdmann is also a German forename and a surname. As a forename it was often given to show the connection with the earth.

In the Baroque the Republic of Venice sent mineralogical prospectors to the countries north of the Alps to look for the raw materials which were necessary for glassmaking. These prospectors were called "Venetians" everywhere else and only in the Black Forest they were called "Stumm-Männle" (meaning "dumb little men", because they did not speak with the local people) were mostly very small, wore an ankle-long tunic with a hood like the cowl of a monk and carefully avoided contact. These mysterious migrants who worked underground, entered with an empty sack which was filled when they came out of the mountain are obviously the prototype of what the legend turned into the "little men of the earth" who were seeking or hiding treasures in the dark galleries of the mountains.

Legend 
In the present case there is a legend which speaks of Erdmännlein: this is the diminutive of Erdmann. Männlein can be translated as manikin or little man (dwarf). Erdmännlein - or its variant Erdmännchen - is also the German word for meerkat, a cute little animal that can resemble a tiny man.

According to the legend the "little men of the earth" who gave their name to the Erdmannshöhle were small men which were hardworking and kind and above all helpful.

Description 
Caves are seldom in the Black Forest, because in the predominant rock types, which are granite and buntsandstein, its formation is rare. Very different is the situation in the mountain massif of the Dinkelberg between High Rhine, Wiese valley and Wehra valley where muschelkalk predominates which allows the formation of holes by erosion processes.

The Erdmannshöhle in Hasel is one of the oldest caves of its type in Germany. The measured total length of the cave is 2185 meters, the part of the cave open to sightseeing is 360 meters long.

The largest stalactite in the cave, which is mentioned in the Guinness Book of Records, has a height of more than 4 meters and is 2 meters thick at the bottom. Its estimated age is about 135000 years.

External links

 Welcome to the realm of the little men of the earth! German
 erdmann-cave on www.black-forest-travel.com; English
 English video
 Erdmannshoehle-Hasel-stalactite-cave on www.blackforest-tourism.com; English
 Opening hours; German
 Entrance fees; German

References

Caves of Germany
Show caves in Germany
Black Forest
Geography of the Black Forest
Landforms of Baden-Württemberg
Lörrach (district)
Baden